Andrej Burza (born 2 November 1979) is a Slovak football midfielder who currently plays for FK Inter Bratislava.

External links

1979 births
Living people
Slovak footballers
Association football midfielders
FK Inter Bratislava players
FC Petržalka players
Slovak Super Liga players